Douw may refer to:

 Douw Calitz (born 1974) South African lawn bowls player
 Douw Steyn (born 1952) South African businessman
 De Peyster Douw Brown (1915–1991) U.S. fighter pilot
 William Douw Lighthall (1857–1954) Canadian lawyer
 Deborah Matilda Douw (1835–1911) U.S. missionary to China
 Gerard Douw (1613–1675) Dutch painter
 Marthen Douw (born 1980) Papuan politician
 Simon Johannes van Douw (born 1639) Flemish painter
 Volkert P. Douw (1720–1801) U.S. merchant

See also

 Douwe
 
 Dauw
 DAUH
 Dau (disambiguation)
 Daw (disambiguation)
 Doe (disambiguation)
 Doh (disambiguation)
 Dou (disambiguation)
 Dow (disambiguation)
 Duh (disambiguation)